Jeong Da-hye (born 18 June 1985), also known in mainland China as Zheng Duohui, is a South Korean actress. She is known for starring in various Korean films such as The Servant, The Etudes of Love and Romance of Their Own as well as in Korean television dramas like Woman of Dignity and Rude Miss Young-ae.

References

External links

Living people
South Korean actresses
1985 births